Lipscomb is an unincorporated community and census-designated place (CDP) in Lipscomb County, Texas, United States. It is the Lipscomb county seat. The population was 37 at the 2010 census.

Geography
Lipscomb is located south of the center of Lipscomb County at  (36.232224, -100.271869). Texas State Highway 305 forms the western edge of the community; the highway leads north  to Darrouzett and south  to Glazier.

Wolf Creek forms the northern border of the community; the creek flows east into Oklahoma to join the North Canadian River.

Lipscomb is the locus of ZIP code 79056.

Climate
According to the Köppen Climate Classification system, Lipscomb has a semi-arid climate, abbreviated "BSk" on climate maps.

Demographics

2020 census

As of the 2020 United States census, there were 66 people, 21 households, and 3 families residing in the CDP.

2000 census
As of the census of 2000, there were 44 people, 25 households, and 14 families living in the CDP. The population density was 8.6 people per square mile (3.3/km2). There were 35 housing units at an average density of 6.9/sq mi (2.6/km2). The racial makeup of the CDP was 90.91% White and 9.09% Native American.

There were 25 households, out of which 4.0% had children under the age of 18 living with them, 52.0% were married couples living together, and 44.0% were non-families. 44.0% of all households were made up of individuals, and 28.0% had someone living alone who was 65 years of age or older. The average household size was 1.72 and the average family size was 2.29.

In the CDP the population was spread out, with 4.5% under the age of 18, 6.8% from 18 to 24, 18.2% from 25 to 44, 34.1% from 45 to 64, and 36.4% who were 65 years of age or older. The median age was 58 years. For every 100 females there were 120.0 males. For every 100 females age 18 and over, there were 110.0 males.

The median income for a household in the CDP was $38,750, and the median income for a family was $58,125. Males had a median income of $35,625 versus $23,750 for females. The per capita income for the CDP was $21,144. There were 9.1% of families and 7.5% of the population living below the poverty line, including no under eighteens and 30.0% of those over 64.

Education
Lipscomb is served by the Canadian Independent School District.

References

County seats in Texas
Census-designated places in Lipscomb County, Texas
Unincorporated communities in Lipscomb County, Texas